Willi Bredel  - Writer. Commissar of the Thälmann Battalion
Ernst Busch - Singer/songwriter/actor.
Ernst Buschmann  - Section leader Hans Beimler Battalion, commander Edgar André Battalion
Franz Dahlem (in German), (14 Jan 1892-17 Dec 1981) - Political commissar, International Brigades
Friedrich Dickel (in German), (9 Dec 1913-22 Oct 1993) - DDR Minister of the Interior.
Julius Deutsch - General, International Brigades
Kurt Julius Goldstein - Editor-in-chief of the major radio station Deutschlandsender
Herbert Grünstein – DDR - Deputy Minister of the Interior
Kurt Hager (24 Jul 1912-18 Sep 1998) -Politburo member
Erich Henschke – Editor-in-chief of Berliner Zeitung 
Karl-Heinz Hoffmann – General of the Nationale Volksarmee (National People's Army) XI International Brigade
Max Kahane – Journalist. Editor of Allgemeiner Deutscher Nachrichtendienst
Hans Kahle (in German) – Divisional commander
Alfred Kantorowicz (12 Aug 1899-27 Mar 1979) - Author
Frieda Kantorowicz - Wife of author and International Brigades administrator 
Egon Erwin Kisch - German-Czech journalist and writer
Karl Mewis (in German), (22 Nov 1907-3 Jan 1987) – District Secretary of the Socialist Unity Party of Germany. Political commissar, International Brigades. 
Ewald Munschke - Major General, Nationale Volksarmee (National People's Army)
Alfred Neumann  (15 Dec 1909-8 Jan 2001) - Politburo member
Erich Mielke (28 Dec 1907-21 May 2000) – Head of the Stasi
Josef Raab (in German) - German resistance leader
Heinrich Rau - Communist, German resistance leader
Ludwig Renn - German writer. Section leader XI International Brigade
Heinrich Schürmann (in German) - Commander Edgar André Battalion
Richard Staimer (in German) - Commander Thälmann Battalion
Toni Stemmler (in German) - Communist, Section leader
Georg Stibi (in German), (25 Jul 1901-30 May 1982) - Journalist. Editor of Berliner Zeitung
Bodo Uhse - Writer
Paul Verner (26. Apr 1911-12 Dec 1986)  – Politburo member XV International Brigade
Wilhelm Zaisser - General "Gomez" - 1937 military leader of the international forces. First head of the Stasi

Sources
Arnold Krammer, Sammelrez: Internationale Brigaden in der DDR (Joint Review: The International Brigades in East Germany)

 
 
Lists of German military personnel